Martha Ackmann (born February 11, 1951) is a journalist and author. Her books include The Mercury 13: The True Story of Thirteen Women and the Dream of Space Flight (2003), Curveball: The Remarkable Story of Toni Stone (2010), and These Fevered Days: Ten Pivotal Moments in the Making of Emily Dickinson (February 2020). Curveball was adapted for the stage by Lydia R. Diamond: Toni Stone had its world premiere with the Roundabout Theatre Company in New York in June 2019. Ackmann's essays and op-eds have appeared in publications including the New York Times, the Washington Post, the Los Angeles Times, and Salon. She is a frequent commentator for New England Public Radio.

Personal life

Ackmann was born in St. Louis and was raised in Florissant, Missouri. Her father, Florenze Ackmann, was a cartographer and her mother, Elizabeth Ray Ackmann, was a nurse. She has two brothers, David and Rod. She is married to Ann Romberger and lives in Western Massachusetts.

She graduated from McCluer High School and received her BA from Lindenwood College, her MA from Middlebury College’s Bread Loaf School of English, and her PhD from the University of Massachusetts. She also completed graduate work at Lincoln College, Oxford University.

Career
After college, Ackmann taught at Ritenour High School in suburban St. Louis, building the school’s journalism program and founding Missouri’s first student-run high school radio station. Ritenour Media Convergence remains one of the most recognized high school journalism programs in the country.

She was on the faculty in the Gender Studies department at Mount Holyoke College from 1986 - 2016. For nearly two decades, she taught a seminar on Emily Dickinson in the poet’s house in Amherst, Massachusetts. She is a past president of the Emily Dickinson International Society, co-founder of Legacy: A Journal of American Women Writers, and was featured in the 2017 Emily Dickinson documentary My Letter to the World.

Ackmann’s books focus on "women who’ve changed America," with special attention to recovering stories of women who have fallen between the cracks of history. Her first book, The Mercury 13, detailed the largely unknown story of thirteen American women pilots who were secretly tested to be astronauts in the early days of the US space program. The book was selected for college and university Common Read programs. In 2007, the University of Wisconsin–Oshkosh awarded the Mercury 13 women honorary degrees and commended Ackmann for embodying "the ideas of social justice and equity in the public sphere."

Ackmann's second book, Curveball, tells the story of Toni Stone, the first woman to play baseball in the Negro leagues. When Henry Aaron moved from the Indianapolis Clowns to the major leagues, Toni Stone replaced him. A fierce second baseman, Stone played against Ernie Banks, Willie Mays, Buck O’Neil, and Jackie Robinson. Producer Samantha Barrie optioned Ackmann's book for the stage, playwright Lydia R. Diamond wrote Toni Stone, and Pam MacKinnon directed the Roundabout Theatre Company production. The play had its world premiere in 2019 at the Laura Pels Theatre in New York and received widespread acclaim. The New York Times called April Matthis's portrayal of Toni Stone "sensational" and named the play a Critic's Pick.

Ackmann's third book, These Fevered Days, examines ten turning points in Emily Dickinson's life. Kirkus Reviews praised the book's "radiant prose, palpable descriptions, and deep empathy for the poet’s sensibility [that] make this biography extraordinary."

Ackmann has presented lectures in Europe and across the United States. Her talks include readings and lectures on women in space, sports equity, and American women writers. Presentations include talks at the Kennedy Space Center, Chicago's Adler Planetarium, the National Baseball Hall of Fame, the Roundabout Theatre, and New York's 92nd Street Y. Ackmann's media appearances include the Today show, CNN, CBS Evening News, NPR, and the BBC.

Awards and honors
Ackmann was awarded a Guggenheim Fellowship in 2008. She was a fellow in nonfiction at the Radcliffe Institute for Advanced Study at Harvard University in 2008–2009.

Selected works

Books
 The Mercury 13: The True Story of Thirteen Women and the Dream of Space Flight (Random House 2003)
 Curveball: The Remarkable Story of Toni Stone, First Woman to Play Professional Baseball in the Negro League (Chicago Review Press 2010)
 These Fevered Days: Ten Pivotal Moments in the Making of Emily Dickinson  (W. W. Norton & Co. February 2020)

References

Living people
Writers from St. Louis
21st-century American women writers
American women journalists
Lindenwood University alumni
Middlebury College alumni
University of Massachusetts Amherst alumni
Mount Holyoke College faculty
21st-century American non-fiction writers
American women non-fiction writers
1951 births
American women academics